William "Will" Wedig is an American filmmaker, focusing on directing and editing.

Biography 
His most recent work includes directing 2011 Forged (film) and Exposure: Sports Illustrated Swimsuit 2011. Wedig also directed the 2007 horror film Rise of the Dead (film)., post-supervised La Soga, and edited a documentary, The Life a House Built: The 25th Anniversary of the Jimmy and Rosalynn Carter Work Project, for This Old House for PBS. His other works are Tryst, La Soga and Salvage.

Personal 
Growing up in Marietta, Ohio, William began making films around ages 10 or 11. He graduated with a degree in film editing from the School of Visual Arts in New York City in 2006.

References

External links

 www.williamwedig.com

1983 births
Living people
American film editors
People from Marietta, Ohio
School of Visual Arts alumni